Paralamyctes mesibovi is a species of centipede in the Henicopidae family. It is endemic to Australia. It was first described in 2001 by palaeontologist Gregory Edgecombe.

Distribution
The species only occurs in the Australian island state of Tasmania. The type locality is Wombat Hill, Waratah, North West Tasmania.

Behaviour
The centipedes are solitary terrestrial predators that inhabit plant litter and soil.

References

 

 
mesibovi
Centipedes of Australia
Endemic fauna of Australia
Fauna of Tasmania
Animals described in 2001
Taxa named by Gregory Edgecombe